St. Ninian's Park (more commonly known as The Oval) is a public park located in the centre of Prestwick, South Ayrshire. The Park was created in 1954 on a site in the centre of Prestwick, previously occupied by farmland. The public park consists of 2 full size football pitches with indoor changing rooms, a tennis centre with 3 indoor courts and 8 outdoor, a 25m indoor swimming pool and gym, indoor bowling green and cricket club.

References 

Sports venues in South Ayrshire
Parks in Scotland
Geography of South Ayrshire
Prestwick